Marcel Reichwein (born 21 February 1986) is a German footballer who plays for Türkspor Dortmund as a striker.

Career
Reichwein began his career with Bayer Leverkusen, and made his debut (and scored) for the reserve team as a substitute for Giovanni Cannata in a 3–2 defeat to Chemnitzer FC at the beginning of the 2005–06 season. He signed for Wuppertaler SV aged 20, and remained with the club for three years, although the middle season was spent on loan at Kickers Emden. He then spent the first half of the 2009–10 season in the 2. Bundesliga with Rot-Weiss Ahlen, and the second with Jahn Regensburg in the 3. Liga. In July 2010 he signed for Rot-Weiss Erfurt, where he spent two successful seasons, the second saw him finish as the 3. Liga top scorer with 17 goals, taking his total at this level 41, then a record. He then signed for VfR Aalen, who had won promotion to the 2. Bundesliga. Two years later, he signed for Preußen Münster.

References

External links

1986 births
Living people
German footballers
FC Rot-Weiß Erfurt players
Bayer 04 Leverkusen II players
Wuppertaler SV players
Kickers Emden players
Rot Weiss Ahlen players
SSV Jahn Regensburg players
VfR Aalen players
SC Preußen Münster players
VfL Wolfsburg II players
KFC Uerdingen 05 players
TSV Steinbach Haiger players
2. Bundesliga players
3. Liga players
Regionalliga players
Association football forwards